The following is a list of national American and Canadian television and radio networks and announcers that have broadcast Stanley Cup Finals games over the years.

American television

National television

2020s

Notes 
 2020 - The NHL initially had plans to produce broadcasts for each game using a skeleton crew on-site, such as cameramen and producers, and then each media partners' commentators on both TV and radio were to call the games remotely. The league then allowed both Sportsnet and NBC commentators into the hubs. As he had been doing throughout the playoffs, 74-year-old NBC lead play-by-play commentator Mike "Doc" Emrick called the Cup Finals off of monitors from his home studio in Metro Detroit, citing his advanced age as a potential risk for severe illness from COVID-19. These were the final games that Emrick called; he announced his retirement on October 19, 2020.
 On March 10, 2021, the National Hockey League and ESPN confirmed a 7-year television deal that will include games not only on ESPN, but also ABC, ESPN+, and Hulu beginning in the 2021–22 season. ABC will also broadcast four Stanley Cup Finals over the life of the contract.
On April 26, 2021, Sports Business Journal reported that NBC had officially pulled out of bidding for future NHL rights, meaning that NBC will not televise NHL games for the first time since the 2004–05 NHL lockout. The next day, Turner Sports announced that they have agreed to a seven-year deal with the NHL to broadcast at least 72 games nationally on TNT and TBS (while also giving HBO Max the live streaming and simulcast rights to these games) beginning with the 2021–22 NHL season, which will include three Stanley Cup Finals, the other half of the Stanley Cup playoffs, and the Winter Classic.
 2021 - NBC lead color commentator Eddie Olczyk missed Game 2 due to a personal matter, so "Inside-the-Glass" reporter Brian Boucher moved to the booth with Kenny Albert, and Pierre McGuire took over for Boucher between the benches. McGuire also fill-in for Boucher in Game 3 for the same reason.
 2022 - ABC's coverage of the Stanley Cup Finals will mark the first time the entire Stanley Cup Final series will be carried exclusively on American broadcast television.
 2023 - TNT's coverage of the Stanley Cup Finals will mark the first time since 1994 that the entire series will be carried on a cable network since ESPN last did it 29 years before (1994), and the first time that it will exclusively be on cable.

2010s

Notes 
 In 2014, NBCSN broadcast Games 3 and 4, while NBC televised the remaining games. NBC Sports originally planned to repeat its coverage pattern from the last few seasons: NBCSN would televise Games 2 and 3, while NBC would broadcast Game 1, and then Games 4 through 7. After the League scheduled Game 2 on the day of the Belmont Stakes, coverage of games two and four were switched so NBC's telecast of the horse race would serve as lead-in programming to Game 2. Due to the death of a family member, NBC lead play-by-play announcer Mike Emrick missed Game 1. Kenny Albert, who was also the New York Rangers radio announcer for WEPN and announced several national games (including the Western Conference Finals) for NBC/NBCSN, filled in for Emrick in the first game.
 It was originally announced that Games 2 and 3 of the 2015 Finals were to be broadcast by NBCSN, with the remainder on NBC. Game 2 was moved to NBC to serve as a lead-out for its coverage of the 2015 Belmont Stakes in favor of Game 4 on NBCSN. As Eddie Olczyk was also a contributor to NBC's Belmont coverage, he missed Game 2.
 On May 27, 2016, NBC Sports announced that if the Finals was tied at 1-1 entering Game 3, then it would have aired on NBC and Game 4 televised on NBCSN. However, if one team led 2-0 (as this eventually happened; Penguins led 2–0), Game 3 would be moved to NBCSN and then Game 4 on NBC.

2000s

Notes 
 Following the 2003–04 season, ESPN was only willing to renew its contract for two additional years at $60 million per year. ABC refused to televise the Stanley Cup Finals in prime time, suggesting that the Finals games it would telecast be played on weekend afternoons (including a potential Game 7). Disney executives later conceded that they overpaid for the 1999–2004 deal, so the company's offer to renew the television rights was lower in 2004.
 2003 was the only year that ABC broadcast both the NBA and the Stanley Cup Finals that involved teams from one city in the same year, as both the New Jersey Nets and the New Jersey Devils were in their respective league's finals. During ABC's broadcast of game three between the San Antonio Spurs and the Nets in New Jersey on June 8, Brad Nessler said that ABC was in a unique situation getting ready for both that game and Game 7 of the Stanley Cup Finals between the Devils and the Mighty Ducks of Anaheim the following night, also at Continental Airlines Arena. Gary Thorne mentioned this the following night, and thanked Nessler for promoting ABC's broadcast of game seven of the Stanley Cup Finals.

1990s

Notes
 Fox split coverage of the Stanley Cup Finals with ESPN. Game 1 of the 1995 Stanley Cup Finals was the first Finals game shown on network television since 1980 and the first in prime time since 1973. Games 1, 5, and 7 were usually scheduled to be televised by Fox; and Games 2, 3, 4, and 6 were set to air on ESPN. However, from 1995 to 1998, the Finals matches were all four game sweeps; the 1999 Finals ended in six games. The consequence was that – except for 1995, when Fox did televise Game 4 – the decisive Game 7 was never shown on network television. Perhaps in recognition of this, Games 3 through 7 were always televised by ABC in the succeeding broadcast agreement between the NHL and ABC Sports/ESPN.
KTVU, the Fox affiliate in the San Francisco Bay Area, dropped Game 4 of the 1995 Stanley Cup Finals (June 24) for a San Francisco Giants game. The game between the Giants and Florida Marlins in Miami had a long rain-delay. This allowed for KTVU to broadcast the hockey game after-all. However, the baseball game finally started before the hockey game ended. KTVU got a lot of complaints, so they re-aired the end of the hockey game next Saturday (July 1).

1980s

Notes 
 1980 - Games 1–5 on Hughes used CBC's feed. For CBS' coverage of Game 6 (which served as a special edition of the CBS Sports Spectacular anthology series), Dan Kelly did play-by-play for 1st and 3rd periods as well as overtime. Meanwhile, Tim Ryan did play-by-play for the second period. Minnesota North Stars' general manager Lou Nanne provided color commentary for the entire game. This was the last time that a National Hockey League game was broadcast on American network television for 10 years (until the 1990 NHL All-Star Game aired on NBC), and the Stanley Cup Finals game on broadcast-network television until 1995.
CBS was mainly influenced by the United States men's Olympic hockey team's surprise gold medal victory (dubbed "The Miracle on Ice") in Lake Placid several months prior. CBS agreed to pay $37 million to broadcast the sixth game. In return, the NHL happily moved the starting time from prime time to the afternoon. The Saturday afternoon game was the first full American network telecast of an NHL game since Game 5 of the 1975 Stanley Cup Finals aired on NBC. Game 6 pulled a 4.4 rating on CBS. After the game ended, except for its owned-and-operated stations in New York City and Philadelphia, CBS discontinued the telecast and went to a previously scheduled golf telecast. New York and Philadelphia viewers saw a post-game show before the network joined the very end of the golf broadcast. Given that the game went into overtime, CBS cut away from hockey during the intermission between the end of regulation and the start of overtime to present ten minutes of live golf coverage, with the golf announcers repeatedly mentioning that the network would return to hockey in time for the start of sudden-death.
 USA Network simulcast the CBC feed for the 1981 Stanley Cup Finals instead of producing their own coverage.
 In the  season, Al Trautwig took over as studio host for USA Network. Dan Kelly did play-by-play with either Gary Green or Rod Gilbert on color commentary. For the playoffs, Dick Carlson and Al Albert were added as play-by-play voices of some games. Meanwhile, Jim Van Horne hosted Stanley Cup Finals games played in Vancouver. Things pretty much remained the same for USA during the  season. Dan Kelly and Gary Green called most games, while Al Albert did play-by-play on several playoff games and hosted the Stanley Cup Finals games from Nassau Coliseum.

1970s

Note

1960s

Notes 
 NBC aired Games 1 and 4 of the 1966 Stanley Cup Finals between the Montreal Canadiens and the Detroit Red Wings. Win Elliot served as the play-by-play man while Bill Mazer served as the color commentator for the games.
 For the 1968 playoffs, Jim Gordon worked play-by-play and Stu Nahan worked color commentator and intermission interviews for CBS. During the regular season, Gordon and Nahan alternated roles each week. For instance, Gordon did the worked play-by-play on December 30 while Nahan worked play-by-play the next week. In , Dan Kelly did play-by-play while Bill Mazer did color and intermission interviews. For the CBS' Stanley Cup Finals coverage during this period, a third voice was added to the booth (Phil Esposito in 1971 and Harry Howell in 1972).

Local television (United States)

1990s

Notes 
 Games 4 and 5 of the 1994 Stanley Cup Finals were broadcast in the New York City area on MSG II because of MSG Network's commitment with the New York Yankees. 1994 was also the last time that local broadcasting of playoff games past the first two rounds was allowed.

1980s

1970s

1960s

Canadian Television (English)

2020s

2010s

2000s

1990s

Note 
 1997 – Don Cherry missed the entire series due to family illness. On Sunday, June 1, his wife, Pennsylvania native Rose, passed away from cancer. Consequently, Ron MacLean did not host Games 2 and 3 as he was attending Don Cherry's wife, Rose's funeral. Scott Russell sat in for him, and Chris Cuthbert took over Russell's reporting role.

1980s

Notes 
 In 1980, Bob Cole, Dan Kelly and Jim Robson shared play-by-play duties for CBC's coverage. Cole did play-by-play for the first half of Games 1, and 2. Meanwhile, Kelly did play-by-play for the rest of Games 1–4 and first half of Game 5 (Kelly also did call the overtime period of Game 1). Finally, Robson did play-by-play for first half of Games 3–4, the rest of Game 5, and Game 6 entirely. In essence, this meant that Cole or Robson would do play-by-play for the first period and the first half of the second period. Therefore, at the closest stoppage of play near the 10 minute mark of the second period, Cole or Robson handed off the call to Kelly for the rest of the game.
 For the 1984–85 and 1985–86 seasons, CTV aired regular season games on Friday nights (and some Sunday afternoons) as well as partial coverage of the playoffs and Stanley Cup Finals. While Molson continued to present Hockey Night in Canada on Saturday nights on CBC, rival brewery Carling O'Keefe began airing Friday Night Hockey on CTV. This marked the first time since beginning broadcasting in 1952 that CBC was not the lone over-the-air network broadcaster of the Stanley Cup Finals in Canada. From 1967 through 1975, both CBC and CTV aired NHL games, but it was from a Molson-led Hockey Night in Canada package that was split. CBC got the Saturday games and the playoffs; Wednesday-night regular-season games appeared on CTV.
 In , CBC televised Games 1 and 2 nationally while Games 3, 4 and 5 were televised in Edmonton only. CTV televised Games 3, 4, and 5 nationally while games were blacked out in Edmonton. Had the series gone to a Game 7, then both CBC and CTV would have televised it while using their own production facilities and crews. Dan Kelly, Ron Reusch, and Brad Park called the games on CTV.
 For Games 1 and 2 of the 1986 Finals, CBC only had the rights to air them locally in Montreal and Calgary, while CTV broadcast it to the rest of the country. CBC would then have the exclusive rights to televise Games 3, 4, and 5 nationally. Had the series gone to a seventh game, then both CBC and CTV would have simultaneously televised it while using their own production facilities and crews. Like the year prior, Dan Kelly and Ron Reusch, and Brad Park called the games for CTV.
 Even though CTV decided to pull the plug on their two-year-old (lasting from 1984 to 1985 through 1985–86) NHL broadcasting venture with the Carling O'Keefe brewing company (citing low ratings and an inability to clear other programming for both regular season and playoff telecasts), Carling O'Keefe retained their rights. This soon led to them syndicating 1987 and 1988 playoff telecasts on a chain of channels that would one day become the Global Television Network. The Global Television Network broadcasts were aired under the names Stanley Cup '87 and Stanley Cup '88, before a merger between Carling O'Keefe and Molson (the presenters of Hockey Night in Canada on CBC) put an end to the competition. When CBC and Global televised Game 7 of the 1987 Stanley Cup Finals, they used separate production facilities and separate on-air talent.
 Game 4 (May 24) of the 1988 Stanley Cup Finals is well known for fog that interfered with the game and a power outage that caused its cancellation before a faceoff. The game ended with the Edmonton Oilers and Boston Bruins tied at 3–3. CBC televised the first Game 4 as well as game 5 (on May 26), for which the Oilers won 6–3.
 In 1988, Canwest-Global had the rights to the Games 6 and 7 of the Finals, which ultimately, were not necessary.

1970s

Notes 
 The most commonly seen video clip of Bobby Orr's famous overtime goal ("The Flight") in Game 4 of the 1970 Stanley Cup Finals is the American version broadcast on CBS as called by Dan Kelly. This archival clip can be considered a rarity, since about 98% of the time, any surviving kinescopes or videotapes of the actual telecasts of hockey games from this era usually emanate from CBC's coverage. According to Dick Irvin, Jr.'s book My 26 Stanley Cups (Irvin was in the CBC booth with Danny Gallivan during the 1970 Stanley Cup Finals), he was always curious why even the CBC prototypically uses the CBS replay of the Bobby Orr goal (with Dan Kelly's commentary) instead of Gallivan's call. The explanation that Irvin received was that the CBC's master tape of the game (along with others) was thrown away in order clear shelf space at the network.
 In , Hockey Night in Canada moved all playoff coverage from CBC to CTV to avoid conflict with the lengthy NABET strike against the CBC. Eventually, MacLaren Advertising, in conjunction with Molson Breweries and Imperial Oil/Esso, who actually owned the rights to Hockey Night in Canada (not CBC) decided to give the playoff telecast rights to CTV. Initially, it was on a game by game basis in the quarterfinals (Game 1 of the Boston-Toronto series was seen on CFTO Toronto in full while other CTV affiliates, but not all joined the game in progress. Game 1 of the New York Rangers–Montreal series was seen only on CFCF Montreal while Game 4 not televised due to a lockout of technicians at the Montreal Forum), and then the full semifinals and Stanley Cup Finals. Because CTV did not have 100% penetration in Canada at this time, they asked CBC (who ultimately refused) to allow whatever one of their affiliates were the sole network in that market to show the playoffs. As a result, the 1972 Stanley Cup playoffs were not seen in some of the smaller Canadian markets unless said markets were close enough to the United States border to pick up the signal of a CBS affiliate that carried Games, 1, 4, or 6 (Games 2, 3, and 5 were not nationally broadcast in the United States).

1960s

Notes 
 The 1961 Stanley Cup Finals were almost not televised in Canada at all. At that time, the CBC only had rights to the Montreal Canadiens and Toronto Maple Leafs' games; home games only during the season and all games in the playoffs. However, with both the Canadiens and Maple Leafs eliminated in the semi-finals, the CBC's worst nightmare became reality. The CBC had to conceive a way to carry the Finals between the Chicago Black Hawks and Detroit Red Wings or face public revolt. According to lore, the CBC found a way to link their Windsor viewers as having a vested interest in the Finals with the across the river Red Wings. Thus, CBC was able to carry the series after inking special contracts with the Red Wings and Black Hawks as a service to the Windsor market. From Windsor, CBC linked the signal to Toronto and they relayed the coverage Dominion-wide. From there, Canadians were able to see the Finals with nary a glitch in the coverage.
 To accommodate the American TV coverage on NBC (1966 marked the first time that a Stanley Cup Finals game was to be nationally broadcast on American network television), Game 1 of the 1966 Stanley Cup Finals was shifted to a Sunday afternoon. This in return, was the first time ever that a National Hockey League game was played on a Sunday afternoon in Montreal. While Games 1 and 4 of the NBC broadcasts were televised in color, CBC carried these games and all other games in black and white.

1950s

Note 
 CBC's coverage of Games 3–5 of the 1954 Stanley Cup Finals were joined in progress at 9:30 p.m. (approximately one hour after start time). Meanwhile, CBC joined Game 6 in at 10 p.m. (again, one hour after start time). Game 7 was carried Dominion wide (nationwide) from opening the face-off at 9 p.m. Since Game 7 was played on Good Friday night, there were no commercials (Imperial Oil was the sponsor).

Local television (Canada)

1980s

Notes 
CTV televised Games 3–5 nationally while games were blacked out in Edmonton. Had the series gone to a Game 7, then both CBC and CTV would have televised it while using their own production facilities and crews.
Had the series gone to a Game 7, then both CBC and CTV would have televised it while using their own production facilities and crews. Like the year prior, Dan Kelly, Ron Reusch, and Brad Park called the games for CTV.

French Canadian television

2020s

2010s

Notes 
 Since 2015, under a sub-license agreement with Rogers, TVA has been the exclusive home of French-language broadcasts in Canada.

2000s

Notes 
 In the 2002–03 season, RDS secured exclusive French language rights to the NHL. The deal, reached with the Canadiens and not directly with the league, was meant to ensure a consistent home for all Canadiens games; as a general-interest network, Radio-Canada cannot give up so much airtime to Canadiens games. The announcement drew the ire of, among others, then-Heritage Minister Sheila Copps, who suggested that the network would somehow be violating its conditions of licence by not airing La Soirée du hockey. In fact, there is no specific mention in the CBC's licence from the CRTC (or any other legal document governing the CBC) that the CBC's networks carry coverage of NHL games, nor that there be parity between the two networks' carriage of such games. Also, Radio-Canada soon reached an agreement to produce the Saturday night games, to remain branded La Soirée du hockey, to be simulcast on both SRC and RDS. However, for reasons that are unclear, that agreement was terminated after the 2004 playoffs. The RDS-produced replacement, Le Hockey du samedi soir, was simulcast on SRC outside Quebec, where RDS has limited distribution, through 2006.

1990s

1980s

1970s

1960s

1950s

Notes 
 French-language broadcasts in Canada also began in 1953, with play-by-play commentator René Lecavalier and colour commentator Jean-Maurice Bailly on CBC's Télévision de Radio-Canada (SRC) division.

American radio

See also
List of current National Hockey League broadcasters
National Hockey League on television

References

External links
Stanley Cup Final Archives - Awful Announcing
NHL Stanley Cup Finals TV Ratings, 1995-2008 
Stanley Cup Final: Games 5 and 6 of Kings/Devils Down From Last Year
Stanley Cup Final: B's/Hawks Earns Second-Largest Game 1 Audience Since ’87
2013 Stanley Cup Final Most-Viewed Since At Least ’94
Stanley Cup Final Game 7 Becomes The Most Watched NHL Game In 38 Years 
2012 NHL Stanley Cup Final Scores 3rd Lowest TV Viewership In At Least 17 Years
Stanley Cup Final Game 7 Is Most-Watched NHL Game In 38 Years
2013 Stanley Cup Final delivers record ratings for NBC

Broadcasters
National Hockey League on television
Lists of National Hockey League broadcasters
ABC Sports
CBC Sports
CBS Sports
CTV Sports
USA Network Sports
Fox Sports announcers
ESPN announcers
SportsChannel
Hughes Television Network
National Hockey League on the radio
Westwood One
ABC Radio Sports
Global Television Network
Turner Sports